Buxeuil is the name of several communes in France:

 Buxeuil, Aube
 Buxeuil, Indre
 Buxeuil, Vienne